Leptura sequoiae is a species of beetle in the family Cerambycidae. It was described by Hopping in 1934.

References

Lepturinae
Beetles described in 1934